The 12131/12132 Dadar Terminus–Sainagar Shirdi Superfast Express is a Superfast Express train belonging to Indian Railways that run between Mumbai and Shirdi in India. It operates as train number 12131 from Dadar Terminus to Sainagar Shirdi and as train number 12132 in the reverse direction.

Coaches

12131/12132 Dadar Terminus–Sainagar Shirdi Superfast Express presently has 1 AC 2 tier, 1 AC 3 tier, 7 Sleeper class & 9 General Unreserved coaches. As with most train services in India, coach composition may be amended at the discretion of Indian Railways depending on demand.

Service

12131 Dadar Terminus–Sainagar Shirdi Superfast Express covers the distance of 336 kilometres in 6 hours 06 mins (55.08 km/hr) & 6 hours 05 mins as 12132 Sainagar Shirdi–Dadar Terminus Superfast Express (55.23 km/hr).

As the average speed of the train is above 55 km/hr, as per Indian Railways rules, its fare includes a Superfast surcharge.

Traction

It is hauled end to end by a Kalyan-based WAP-4 or WAP-7 Loco.

Time Table

12131 Dadar Terminus–Sainagar Shirdi Superfast Express leaves Dadar Terminus on Monday, Wednesday, Saturday at 21:45 hrs IST and reaches Sainagar Shirdi at 03:51 hrs IST the next day.

12132 Sainagar Shirdi–Dadar Terminus Superfast Express leaves Sainagar Shirdi on Tuesday, Thursday & Sunday at 22:25 hrs IST and reaches Dadar Terminus at 04:30 hrs IST the next day.

External links
 http://goindia.about.com/b/2010/08/28/new-direct-train-from-mumbai-to-shirdi.htm
 http://epaper.timesofindia.com/Default/Scripting/ArticleWin.asp?From=Archive&Source=Page&Skin=pastissues2&BaseHref=TOIM/2010/08/28&PageLabel=13&EntityId=Pc01308&ViewMode=HTML
https://sai-baba.in/sai-baba-live-darshan/

References 

Transport in Mumbai
Transport in Shirdi
Express trains in India
Rail transport in Maharashtra